Pupilla sterrii is a species of minute air-breathing land snail, a terrestrial pulmonate gastropod mollusk or micromollusk in the family Pupillidae.

Distribution 
This species has a scattered distribution and occurs in a number of areas including Eurasia: the Alps and Carpathians to Turkey and NW China

 Endangered in Germany
 Lower concern in Austria
 Lower concern in Switzerland
 Italy
 Vulnerable in the Czech Republic
 Slovakia
 Poland
 Ukraine

In lower altitudes the species is threatened by continuous habitat destructions.

Description 
The shell is light horny coloured, weathering grey, finely ribbed. Whorls are strongly convex with deep suture. The aperture is with 2 teeth.

The height of the shell is 2.8-3.5 mm. The width of the shell is 1.6 mm.

|

Ecology 
Pupilla sterrii lives in grass in very dry and sunny areas of limestone rock, between stones, and on dry meadows on calcareous substrate. In north Italy it occurs up to 2800 m.

This species is Ovoviviparous.

References
This article incorporates public domain text from the reference.

Pupillidae
Gastropods described in 1840